Michelle Gardner-Quinn (January 28, 1985 – October 2006) was an undergraduate at the University of Vermont who was kidnapped on October 7, 2006. Her body was later found along a road in the neighboring town of Richmond on October 13.

Disappearance and murder
In the early morning hours of October 7, Gardner-Quinn was walking home in Burlington, Vermont to her campus dormitory after a night out with friends. She borrowed a cell phone from a passerby, Brian Rooney, to call an acquaintance. A jewelry store surveillance camera captured Gardner-Quinn walking east with Rooney at approximately 2:34 am. Six days later, her body was found by hikers near Huntington Gorge in Richmond, Vermont. An autopsy revealed she had been sexually assaulted, beaten and strangled.

Assailant
At a press conference on October 13, police announced that they had found Gardner-Quinn's body and arrested Brian L. Rooney (born June 27, 1970) on separate charges unrelated to the case.  Rooney, a construction worker with several prior arrests, is facing charges from neighboring Caledonia County that pertain to sexual assault and lewd conduct with a child. Federal charges were filed against Rooney as of 1998. He had also been charged with lewd and lascivious conduct with a minor in Essex County, about 80 miles east of Burlington, and with sexual assault on a minor and on an 18-year-old woman. Rooney is believed to have used an ether-soaked cloth to subdue and incapacitate the woman. A former girlfriend with whom he had a child has said that he threatened to kill her on numerous occasions. According to court documents, Rooney is believed to have three children with as many mothers.

In addition to being the person who last saw Gardner-Quinn, Rooney was reportedly seen with cuts on his hands when he stopped at a business in Winooski several days later.  On October 25, police announced that they had charged Rooney with aggravated homicide in the death of Gardner-Quinn. He pled not guilty.

At a press meeting, Rooney's lawyer accidentally revealed confidential information about DNA evidence, which resulted in the trial going under lock-and-key.

On May 22, 2008, Brian Rooney was convicted of aggravated murder in Rutland, Vermont, by a 12-member jury. Rooney's guilt was based largely on the strength of DNA evidence taken from semen found inside Quinn's body, while his lawyer argued that "two nanograms of sperm" handled by a forensic lab with a history of sloppy work was not sufficient to convict.

Sentence and appeal
On October 17, 2008, Rooney was sentenced to life imprisonment without the possibility of parole (under Vermont law, the only available sentence for aggravated murder). Judge Michael Kupersmith admonished him, stating that: "You are the lowest of the low." Rooney expressed condolences to Quinn's family but maintained he is innocent.

Rooney's lawyer, David Sleigh argued that he should be acquitted outright because the State failed to prove that Gardner-Quinn's death occurred at the time of her rape, which is a requirement for the crime of aggravated murder with which he was charged. In February 2011, the Vermont Supreme Court ruled that Rooney's trial was carried out appropriately. As voted in a 3-2 decision, Rooney's sentence of life in prison without parole will stand.

The Vermont Department of Corrections houses a portion of their inmates in out-of-state institutions. Rooney is currently housed at the Lee Adjustment Center in Beattyville, Kentucky. His inmate identification number is 18539.

Aftermath

Cosmopolitan magazine featured Gardner-Quinn's story, "The Murder of a Beautiful Girl", in its February 2007 issue.

A non-profit organization, Michelle's Earth Foundation (MEF) has been founded in her memory. It is devoted to promoting youth involvement and awareness in environmentalism, about which Gardner-Quinn cared deeply.

Her parents are creating a scholarship in her name at UVM (WPTZ)

An essay she wrote (just days before her abduction) about her environmental beliefs was featured at Live Earth concerts in July 2007 and on an August 5 National Public Radio broadcast.

Her essay, "A Reverence For All Life", has also been published in the book, This I Believe II: More Personal Philosophies of Remarkable Men and Women.

See also
List of solved missing persons cases

References

External links
Michelle's Earth Foundation homepage
Common Dreams article about video
NPR This I Believe: A Reverence for All Life
An Online Memorial to Michelle Gardner-Quinn
 Friends eulogize Vermont college student
 Memorial Held At University of Vermont
 Autopsy Under Way On Vermont Student
 Judge berates student's killer, gives him life, CNN.com, October 17, 2008
 Vt. High Court: Rooney sentence stands, WCAX.com, Jack Thurston, February 4, 2011

2000s missing person cases
2006 in Vermont
2006 murders in the United States
October 2006 events in the United States
October 2006 crimes
Sexual assaults in the United States
Kidnappings in the United States
Missing person cases in Vermont
Deaths by person in Vermont
Deaths by beating in the United States
Deaths by strangulation in the United States
Incidents of violence against women
Burlington, Vermont
Female murder victims
People murdered in Vermont
Women in Vermont